The Helms 24 is an American trailerable sailboat that was designed by Stuart Windley as a cruiser and first built in 1977.

Production
The design was built by Jack A. Helms Co., a furniture maker in Irmo, South Carolina, United States. Production was started in 1977 with 750 boats completed in total, but it is now out of production.

Design
The Helms 24 is a recreational keelboat, built predominantly of fiberglass, with wood trim. It has a masthead sloop rig, a raked stem, a plumb transom, a transom-hung rudder controlled by a tiller and a fixed fin keel or optional shoal draft keel. It displaces  and carries  of ballast.

The boat is normally fitted with a small  outboard motor for docking and maneuvering. A Yanmar 1GM10 diesel inboard engine was optional.

The design has sleeping accommodation for five people, with a double "V"-berth in the bow cabin and two straight settees in the main cabin, with the port one able to be converted into a double. The galley is located on the starboard side at the companionway ladder. The galley is "L"-shaped and is equipped with a two-burner stove, icebox and a sink. The head is located just aft of the bow cabin on both sides and includes a sink.

Operational history
In a 2010 review Steve Henkel wrote, "the brochure says she sleeps five, with the port settee converting to a double. But even assuming the starboard settee extends aft under the stove for foot room, it's hard to imagine five full-sized humans sleeping aboard comfortably, especially with the kiddy-sized V-berth forward. Best features: With her wide beam and high sheer, her space ... and headroom are much better than her comp[etitor]s. Her longer waterline and higher B/D ratio also help in the speed department, as indicated by her lower PHRF rating. Worst features: There may have been problems with leakage around the external lead keel seam..."

See also
List of sailing boat types

References

External links
Photo of a Helms 24

Keelboats
1970s sailboat type designs
Sailing yachts
Trailer sailers
Sailboat type designs by Stuart Windley
Sailboat types built by Jack A. Helms Co.